A mkhare (mxare) is a type of administrative division in the country of Georgia. It is usually translated as "region".

According to presidential decrees in 1994 and 1996, Georgia's division into regions is on a provisional basis until the secessionist conflicts in Abkhazia and South Ossetia are resolved. The regional administration is headed by a State Commissioner (სახელმწიფო რწმუნებული, Saxelmćipo Rćmunebuli, usually translated as "Governor"), an official appointed by the President.

The regions are further subdivided into raionis (districts). There are 9 regions in Georgia (see also map opposite):

See also 
 Administrative divisions of Georgia

References

 
Types of administrative division
Georgian words and phrases